Marta Flich (born 1978 in Valencia) is a Spanish economist and actress.

Biography 

She was born in Valencia, but has lived most of her life in La Vall d'Uixó. When she was seven years old, she began to study piano and singing in the Conservatory of Music. She graduated in Economy by the University of Valencia and has a master in International Trade by the University of Delaware. She has worked in banking, a profession that she combined with her training in acting. In addition to working as an actress, she has also worked as a television presenter.

From 2016 she published a video blog in the Huffington Post where she explains the economic news in a simple and sarcastic way.

Television

Cinema

Theatre 

Actress

Director

References 

Spanish film actresses
Spanish stage actresses
Spanish television actresses
21st-century Spanish actresses
Spanish bloggers
Spanish women film directors
Spanish theatre directors
Spanish economists
Spanish women economists
1978 births
Living people
People from Valencia
Spanish women bloggers